Hanuka is a surname. Notable people with the surname include:

 Asaf Hanuka (born 1974), Israeli illustrator and comic book artist
 Tomer Hanuka (born 1974), Israeli illustrator and comic book artist
 Shlomi Hanuka (born 1985), Israeli football/soccer player

See also 
 Hanukkah